Francesco Luigi Simone (born 21 July 1949) is an Italian singer-songwriter, composer and television host, known as "il poeta con la chitarra" ("the poet with the guitar") for the poetical value of his lyrics.

Background 
Born in Acquarica del Capo in the province of Lecce, in the salentine peninsula of the region of Apulia, Simone started his career winning the Castrocaro Music Festival in 1972.  In 1974 he entered the competition at the Sanremo Music Festival with the song "Fiume grande", obtaining his first success in the Italian hit parade. "Fiume grande" also had a significant international success in its French and Spanish version (under the titles, respectively, "Je ne comprends plus rien" and "Río Grande").

In 1976, with the LP Il poeta con la chitarra, Simone got his main success in Italy with the song "Tu e così sia", which peaked fourth in the Italian hit parade. In the following years Simone grew his international popularity, especially in Latin America, where he gradually focused his career.

In 1977 his LP Respiro was a great success, and Respiro, the song that gives the title to the album, is still the best known and loved by the Italian public. The following year (1978) he released the album Paesaggio (Landscape) which will obtain a resounding success in Latin America and in particular in Argentina, where, with the following albums, he will repeatedly reach the first position of the charts in the hit parade. The song Paisaje will become one of the most popular songs in the Spanish language with dozens of coves like those of Gilda and Vicentico.

In 1993 his LP La Ley del Alma (y de la piel), containing the Spanish versions of his songs, reached the 13th position in the USA Billboard Hit Parade, first LP of the parade not sung in English[4].

From 2008 to 2011 he gave singing lessons at "Star Rose Academy" in Rome where he taught to sister Cristina Scuccia, the winner of "The Voice of Italy 2014".

In 2011 he won the Globo d'oro for Best Song for the song "Accanto" included in the film Native.

In 2013-2014 he composed the symphonic-rock opera "Stabat Mater" (on the 13th century Latin text by Jacopone da Todi) sung together with the rocker Michele Cortese end the Anglo-Italian tenor Gianluca Paganelli.

In 2015 his song "Per Fortuna" ("Por Suerte" in Spanish), sung by Michele Cortese, won the 56th edition of the Latin American Festival of Viña del Mar (Chile).

In 2018 he writes and sings the song Ballando sul prato in a duet with Rita Pavone and in 2020 he writes and sings the song Come gira il mondo in a duet with Paolo Belli.

In 2020 he began his collaboration with Andrea Morricone with whom he wrote 2 songs (Azzurri gli Oceani and Cambia la città) included in the album Franco è il nome (first of a trilogy) released in 2021 which contains, in addition to his hits (Respiro, Cara Droga, A quest'ora, Tentazione, Gocce, Tu per me) revisited and rearranged by Alex Zuccaro, the cover of Lucio Dalla's Caruso and the translation of Hello (Solo se mi vuoi) by Lionel Richie, together with the duets with Rita Pavone and Paolo Belli, and other unpublished pieces, including those sung in duet with Cinzia Marzo (by Officina Zoè) and with Zeta (Benedetta Zuccaro).

In 2022 he celebrated his 50 years of career with the nomination of Mario Draghi as Cavaliere, a triumphal tour in Chile and the release of a new album, Simone è il cognome (second in the trilogy), which contains, in addition to his successes (Paesaggio, La casa in via del Campo, Ritratto, Capitano, L'infinito tra le dita, Sogno della Galleria, Sono nato cantando, Notte di San Lorenzo  and Totò) rearranged by Alex Zuccaro, covers of Povera Patria by Franco Battiato and Mina's L'ultima occasione and other new songs such as Figlia, Acqua e Luce, and duets with Paola Arnesano and Antonio Amato.

Discography
1972 - Se di mezzo c'è l'amore (Ri-Fi, RDZ-ST S 14226)
1974 - La notte mi vuole bene (Ri-Fi, RDZ-ST S 14240)
1976 - Il poeta con la chitarra (Ri-Fi, RDZ-ST S 14274)
1977 - Respiro (Ri-Fi, RDZ-ST S 14287)
1978 - Paesaggio (Ri-Fi, RDZ-ST S 14300)
1979 - Franco Simone (Franco Simone & C. / WEA, FS 9001)
1980 - Racconto a due colori (Franco Simone & C. / WEA, FS 9002)
1982 - Gente che conosco (Franco Simone & C. / WEA, FS 9004)
1984 - Camper (SGM, 91001)
1986 - Il pazzo, lo zingaro ed altri amici (Targa, TAL 1413)
1989 - Totò (Skizzo / Fonit Cetra, LPX 233)
1990 - Vocepiano - dizionario dei sentimenti (Skizzo - Discomagic, LP 486)
1995 - Venti d'amore (2 inediti) (Nibbio / Skizzo - Fonit Cetra, CDL 391)
1996 - Una storia lunga una canzone (Nibbio / Skizzo - Fonit Cetra, CDL 410)
1998 - Notturno fiorentino (Nibbio / Skizzo - RTI, CNT 21132)
2001 - Eliopolis - La città del sole (Segnali Caotici, 253750053-2)(with the Great Balkanic Orchestra of Nikos Papakostas)
2003 - Dizionario (rosso) dei sentimenti - VocEpiano (Azzurra, DA1012) (+ DVD)
2010 - Nato tra due mari (CD La musica del mare + DVD Le parole del mare - Skizzo distribuzione Self, ICEBOX 10/05)
2011 - C'era il sole ed anche il vento... - Skizzo distribuzione Self, ICEBOX 10/06
2011 - La musica del mare (reprint of the CD "La musica del mare" of the CD box "Nato tra due mari" in 2010 with bonus track "Accanto" winner of the Golden Globe 2011 for the best film song (Skizzo distribuzione Self, ICEBOX 10/07)
2014 - Stabat Mater, symphonic rock opera (Latin text by Jacopone da Todi) featuring Michele Cortese e Gianluca Paganelli, special guest Rita Cammarano
2016 - Carissimo Luigi (Franco Simone canta Luigi Tenco)
2018 - Per fortuna (Compilation) “Per fortuna” vincitrice “Festival di Viña del mar” 2015 miglior canzone internazionale.
2021 - Franco è il nome (Skizzo Edizioni Musicali)
2022 - Simone è il cognome (Skizzo Edizioni Musicali)

References

Bibliography
Stasi, Carlo (2016). Sono nato cantando... tra due mari (radici e canto nella poetica di Franco Simone, cantautore salentino). Sannicola: iQuadernidelBardo. p. 38. .

External links
 

 

1949 births
People from the Province of Lecce
Italian singer-songwriters
Italian pop singers
Living people
Italian composers
Italian male composers
Spanish-language singers of Italy